Radosław Aleksander Zawrotniak (born 2 September 1981 in Kraków, Małopolskie) is a Polish fencer who won a silver medal in Men's Team Épée (Fencing) at the 2008 Summer Olympics in Beijing, together with Tomasz Motyka, Adam Wiercioch, and Robert Andrzejuk.

For his sport achievements, he received: 
 Golden Cross of Merit in 2008.

Record Against Selected Opponents
Includes results from all competitions 2006–present and major competitions from pre - 2006. The list includes athletes who have reached the quarterfinals at the World Championships or Olympic Games, plus those who have earned medals in major team competitions.

  Joaquim Videira 1-2
  Dmitriy Karuchenko 1-0
  Érik Boisse 0-1

References

sports-reference

1981 births
Living people
Polish male fencers
Fencers at the 2008 Summer Olympics
Fencers at the 2012 Summer Olympics
Olympic fencers of Poland
Olympic silver medalists for Poland
Sportspeople from Kraków
Medalists at the 2008 Summer Olympics
European Games competitors for Poland
Fencers at the 2015 European Games
Olympic medalists in fencing